Johannes Thorvald Eriksen (12 June 1889 – 25 June 1963) was a Danish wrestler who competed in the 1908 Summer Olympics, in the 1912 Summer Olympics, and in the 1920 Summer Olympics. He was born and died in Frederiksberg.

In 1908, he was eliminated in the quarter-finals of the Greco-Roman middleweight competition.

Four years later, he was eliminated in the fifth round of the Greco-Roman light-heavyweight class after losing his fight to August Rajala.

At the 1920 Games, he won the bronze medal in the Greco-Roman light-heavyweight competition.

References

External links
 

1889 births
1963 deaths
Olympic wrestlers of Denmark
Wrestlers at the 1908 Summer Olympics
Wrestlers at the 1912 Summer Olympics
Wrestlers at the 1920 Summer Olympics
Danish male sport wrestlers
Olympic bronze medalists for Denmark
Olympic medalists in wrestling
Medalists at the 1920 Summer Olympics
Sportspeople from Frederiksberg
20th-century Danish people